Club Universitario de Deportes, also known as Universitario or La "U", is a Peruvian football club based in Lima. The club has participated in 46 editions of club competitions governed by CONMEBOL, the chief authority in South American football. These include 33 seasons in the Copa Libertadores, 7 season in the Copa Sudamericana, 4 seasons in the Copa Merconorte and 2 seasons in the Copa CONMEBOL. The club plays its home matches at the Estadio Monumental "U" since it was opened in late 2000 for international competitions. Prior to this stadium's opening, Universitario chose to be the home team in Peru's Estadio Nacional since it began competing in the Copa Libertadores.

Overall

Copa Libertadores

Copa Sudamericana

Copa Merconorte

Copa CONMEBOL

References

Club Universitario de Deportes